Royan – Médis Aerodrome is an aerodrome located  east of Royan, France.

Statistics

References

Airports in Nouvelle-Aquitaine
Charente-Maritime
Airports established in 1910